Ammon is a Canadian community in Moncton Parish, New Brunswick. Ammon includes the Intersection at Ammon Rd and New Brunswick Route 490.  Ammon is in part of Greater Moncton.

History

Notable people

See also
List of communities in New Brunswick
Greater Moncton
List of entertainment events in Greater Moncton

References

Bordering communities

Communities in Westmorland County, New Brunswick
Communities in Greater Moncton